The 2014 FINA High Diving World Cup was held in Kazan, Russia, from 8 August to 10 August 2014. It was the first edition of the FINA High Diving World Cup competition. The event consisted of a men's competition from the 27m platform (won by Orlando Duque) and a women's competition from the 20m platform (won by Rachelle Simpson).

External links 
 FINA High Diving World Cup 2014

International aquatics competitions hosted by Russia
FINA
FINA High Diving World Cup
2014 in Russian sport
Sport in Kazan
21st century in Kazan